The discography of Misfits, a horror punk band formed in Lodi, New Jersey, in 1977, consists of seven studio albums, three live albums, four compilation albums, four EPs, nineteen singles, one video album, five music videos, one box set, one demo, and one cancelled album.

The Misfits were formed in 1977 by singer and songwriter Glenn Danzig. The band experienced many lineup changes during their first six years, with Danzig and bassist Jerry Only being the only constant fixtures. They released their first single, "Cough/Cool", in 1977 on Danzig's own label Blank Records. Mercury Records offered Danzig thirty hours of free studio time in exchange for the trademark to the Blank Records name, which the band used to record their first album, Static Age, in January 1978. However, they were unable to find a record label willing to release it and instead released four of the songs as the "Bullet" single on Danzig's new imprint Plan 9 Records. Static Age would not be released in its entirety for another eighteen years. The band released two additional singles in 1979: "Horror Business" and "Night of the Living Dead", both on Plan 9.

The band's first EP, Beware, was released in January 1980. That August they recorded twelve new songs intended for an album, but it was never released. Only's brother Doyle then became the band's guitarist and would remain so until 2000. Three of the songs from the album sessions were released as 3 Hits from Hell in April 1981, and two more were released as the "Halloween" single in October. Throughout 1981 the Misfits recorded songs for their first full-length album Walk Among Us, which was released in March 1982 through Ruby Records and Slash Records. A promotional music video was filmed for the song "Braineaters". That December they released a live EP titled Evilive. The band broke up due to internal tensions on October 29, 1983, just two months before their second album Earth A.D./Wolfs Blood was released through Plan 9. Following the band's breakup a posthumous single for "Die, Die My Darling" was released in 1984, followed by two compilation albums of out-of-print and previously unreleased material released through Caroline Records: Legacy of Brutality (1985) and Misfits (1986), which later became more commonly referred to as Collection I. Evilive was also re-released in 1987 as a full album.

After a series of legal battles ending in 1995, Jerry Only and Doyle re-formed the band with a new lineup including singer Michale Graves and drummer Dr. Chud. Caroline Records released Collection II that year, followed in 1996 by a box set titled simply The Misfits collecting nearly all of the band's early material, including Static Age which was released as a separate album in 1997. Also in 1997 the new Misfits lineup released American Psycho on Geffen Records, supported by music videos for "American Psycho" and the single "Dig Up Her Bones". Evillive II was released in 1998, followed by Famous Monsters in 1999 on Roadrunner Records with a single and music video for "Scream!" Graves, Chud, and Doyle all left the band in 2000, and a compilation of demos and b-sides from this era was released in 2001 as Cuts from the Crypt. Caroline Records attempted that year to release the material from the August 1980 sessions as 12 Hits from Hell, but the album was cancelled at the request of Danzig and Only before it could be released.

As the only remaining member of the Misfits, Jerry Only took over vocal duties and recruited Dez Cadena and Marky Ramone to fill out the band. This lineup released Project 1950 in 2003, an album of cover versions of rock and roll songs from the 1950s and 1960s, on their own label Misfits Records. Ramone was replaced by Robo in 2005, and this lineup released the "Land of the Dead" single in 2009. The Misfits lineup of Only, Cadena, and drummer Eric Arce released the band's seventh studio album, The Devil's Rain, in 2011. A live album, Dead Alive!, was released in February 2013.

Studio albums 

I Static Age was recorded in 1978 but was not released in its entirety until 1996, as part of the Misfits box set. It was released as a stand-alone album in 1997.

Live albums 

I Evilive was first released as a 7-song EP in 1982. It was re-released as a 12-song album in 1987.

II Evillive II was released only to members of the Fiend Club.

Compilation albums 

I Misfits is commonly referred to as Collection I.

EPs 

I Evilive was first released as a 7-song EP in 1982. It was re-released as a 12-song album in 1987.

Singles

Video albums 

I The DVD was packaged with the Project 1950 album.

Music videos

Box sets

Demos 

I The Mars Attacks Demos were recorded for the American Psycho album and a proposed Mars Attacks EP that was never released. These tracks were re-released on Cuts from the Crypt.

Other appearances 
The following Misfits tracks were released on compilation albums. Some songs were later re-released on Cuts from the Crypt, as noted below. This is not an exhaustive list: songs that were first released on the band's albums, EPs, or singles are not included.

I Denotes songs that were re-released on Cuts from the Crypt.

Cancelled albums 

I 12 Hits from Hell was cancelled at the request of Glenn Danzig and Jerry Only. Only promotional copies were released, and all copies intended for distribution were destroyed.

Tribute albums
Violent World: A Tribute to the Misfits, released in 1997.
Hell on Earth: A Tribute to the Misfits, released in 2000.
Fiend Club Lounge, by The Nutley Brass, released in 2005.
We Are 821: A Tribute to the Misfits, by VCR released in 2015.

References

External links
 

Punk rock group discographies
Discographies of American artists
Discography